Nodaway River Bridge is located west of Grant, Iowa, United States. The Montgomery County Board of Supervisors accepted a petition from S. M. Smith to build a bridge over the Nodaway River south of Grant in June 1876, and another bridge over the Nishnabotna River at the same time. The county contracted with the Missouri Valley Bridge & Iron Co. of Leavenworth, Kansas, to design and build the Nodaway River bridge, which was completed later the same year for $1,000. The bridge consists of a single-span Bowstring arch-truss with a wood deck. It remained in use as a road bridge until 1968, when it was moved to the park for use as a pedestrian bridge. Even though it is no longer in its historic location and used for its historic function, the bridge was listed on the National Register of Historic Places in 1998 as an example of early transportation development in Iowa.

See also
List of bridges documented by the Historic American Engineering Record in Iowa

References

External links

Bridges completed in 1876
Transportation buildings and structures in Montgomery County, Iowa
Arch bridges in Iowa
Historic American Engineering Record in Iowa
Road bridges on the National Register of Historic Places in Iowa
National Register of Historic Places in Montgomery County, Iowa
Relocated buildings and structures in Iowa
Tied arch bridges in the United States